The St George's, Hanover Square by-election of 1918 was held on 4 October 1918.  The by-election was held due to the death of the incumbent Conservative MP, Sir George Reid.  It was won by the Conservative candidate Sir Newton Moore, who was elected unopposed.

References 

St George's, Hanover Square by-election
St George's, Hanover Square by-election
St George's, Hanover Square by-election
St George's, Hanover Square,1918
1910s in the City of Westminster
St George's, Hanover Square,1918
Unopposed by-elections to the Parliament of the United Kingdom in English constituencies